ISO 5775 is an international standard for labeling the size of bicycle tires and rims. The system used was originally developed by the European Tyre and Rim Technical Organisation (ETRTO).  It is designed to make tire sizing consistent and clear.  It replaces overlapping informal systems that ambiguously distinguished between sizes.  For example, at least 6 different "26 inch" sizes exist (just by American notation), and "27 inch" wheels have a larger diameter than American "28 inch" (French "700C") wheels.  The Japanese Industrial Standards Committee also cooperates with ISO 5775. The corresponding Japanese standards are JIS D 9112 for tires and JIS D 9421 for rims.

Tires

Wired-edge tires 

Wired-edge tires can be mounted on straight-side or crochet-type (aka hook bead) rims. Crochet-type rims are not the same as hooked-bead rims. Such tires are designated with their nominal width and their nominal rim diameter, separated by a hyphen (-). Both are measured in millimeters. A typical example of a tire marking according to ISO 5775-1 is:

 32-597 inflate to 400 kPa

 The first number (nominal section width) is essentially the width of the inflated tire (minus any tread).
 The second number (nominal rim diameter) is the inner diameter of the tire when it is mounted on the rim. The corresponding circumference can be measured with a suitably narrow tape inside the rim.
 The recommended inflation pressure is marked in kilopascals.

The standard notes that the minimum inflation pressure recommended is 300 kPa for narrow tires (25 mm section width or less), 200 kPa for other sizes in normal highway service, and 150 kPa for off-the-road service.

The inner width of the rim on which the tire is mounted should be about 65% of the tire's nominal section width for tires smaller than 30 mm and 55% for those larger.

The section height of a tire is usually identical to its section width (for tires less than 28 mm, 2.5 mm have to be added to the width to get the height). The overall diameter of the tire is then the rim diameter plus twice the tire's section height. The ISO 5775-1 standard also defines procedures for measuring tires and for calculating from the marking the maximum dimensions of a tire, which are needed by designers to determine clearance distances to other bicycle components.

Nominal section widths
The standard defines a set of nominal section widths for wired-edge tires and lists recommended rim widths for each:

Older markings

Note how in the below sorted table the "inches" measure is inconsistent with the mm measures, if height varies: Some 28" tires then have less mm than a 27" tire. 584 mm tires are also marketed as 27.5" (outer diam.) tires. 
Older markings of wired-edge tires can be converted to ISO 5775 designations with the help of the following table:

Such older markings can be appended to the ISO 5775 designation in parentheses.

Beaded-edge tires

Beaded-edge tires are mounted on hooked-bead rims. They are marked with an overall diameter code and a nominal section-width code, separated by a cross (×). An example for such a marking is

20×1.375

Rims

ISO 5775-2 defines designations for bicycle rims. It distinguishes between

 Straight-side (SS) rims
 Crochet-type (C) rims
 Hooked-bead (HB) rims

Both crochet (C) and hooked-bead (HB) rims have inner profiles that curve inwards near the outside diameter of the rim to provide a hook that helps retain the tire bead under high pressure.  On modern bikes crochet rims are most common and hooked bead rims are rare.  The distinction is primarily that hooked-bead rims lack the defined bead seat of straight side and hooked bead rims.  The tire is held in position radially by the hook without a bead seat playing a role.  Without a bead seat, the primary designation of the diameter in terms of the bead seat is not applicable, and the governing diameter is the OD.

Rims are designated by their nominal rim diameter and their nominal width, separated by a cross (×). Both are measured in millimeters. The rim type codes SS or HB precede the rim designation, whereas code C is appended to the nominal width. Examples:

 SS 400×20, HB 422×25, 620×13C

The nominal width of a rim is the inner width between the straight sides or beads as one can easily measure it with a caliper (see the standard for drawings and exact measurement procedures).

The standard widths of straight-side rims are:

 18, 20, 22, 24, 27, 30.5

The standard widths of crochet-type rims are:

 13C, 15C, 16C, 17C, 19C, 21C, 23C, 25C

The standard widths of hooked-bead rims are:

 20, 25, 27

The diameters of straight-side and crochet-type rims are measured as the bead seat diameter (BSD).  Standard values are:

 194, 203, 222, 239, 248, 251, 279, 288, 298, 305, 317, 330, 337, 340, 349, 355, 357, 369, 381, 387, 390, 400, 406, 419, 428, 432, 438, 440, 451, 457, 484, 489, 490, 498, 501, 507, 520, 531, 534, 540, 541, 547, 559, 565, 571, 584, 590, 597, 609, 622, 630, 635, 642

The diameters of hooked-bead rims are measured as the outside diameter of the rim (not the tire).  Standard values are:

 270, 321, 372, 422, 459, 473, 510, 524, 560, 575, 611

See also
Bicycle wheel

External links
 
 . handbook by a German tyre manufacturer, includes detailed size tables

References

International Standard ISO 5775-1:1997, Bicycle tyres and rims — Part 1: Tyre designations and dimensions
International Standard ISO 5775-2:1996, Bicycle tyres and rims — Part 2: Rims
JIS standard D 9421. (2009) (English): Bicycles — Rims

05775
Bicycle parts
Tires